The Anglican dioceses of Eastern Uganda are the Anglican presence in (roughly) the Eastern Region, Uganda; they are part of the Church of Uganda. The remaining dioceses of the Church are in the areas of Buganda, of Northern Uganda, of Ankole and Kigezi, and of Rwenzori.

Diocese of Mbale
Erected from the Diocese of Uganda in 1926. In 1954, four archdeaconries were created: West Nile; Lango and Acholi; Teso and Karamoja; and Mbale; there was an Archdeacon of Elgon until that point. By 1953, St Phillip the Evangelist, Ngora was a pro-cathedral of the diocese; it later became a full cathedral of successor dioceses. In preparation for the creation of the independent church province, the diocese was split in three parts in 1961: Teso and Karamoja became Soroti diocese; the Northern Province the Diocese of Northern Uganda; and Mbale, Bugisu and Bukedi remained and was renamed Mbale. When Usher-Wilson was (re)installed as ordinary of the newly-split Mbale diocese, it was at St Andrew's, Mbale.

Bishops on the Upper Nile
1926–1936?: Arthur Kitching
1936–1961: Lucian Usher-Wilson (became Mbale)
June 19551961: Keith Russell, assistant bishop (became first diocesan Bishop of Northern Uganda)
Stephen Tomusange, assistant bishop (became first diocesan Bishop of Soroti)

Bishops of Mbale
1961July 1964 (res.): Lucian Usher-Wilson (became an Assistant Bishop of Guildford)
1964?: Erisa Masaba (previously Archdeacon of Masaba)
1976April 1979 (d.): John Wasikye
198119 November 1991 (d.): Akisoferi Wesonga
bef. 2000bef. 2008: Samwiri Wabulakha
17 August 2008present: Patrick Gidudu

Diocese of Soroti
One of the two split from Upper Nile diocese in 1961 was the Diocese of Soroti; her cathedral is St Peter's Cathedral, Soroti.

Bishops of Soroti
19611965: Stephen Tomusange (previously assistant bishop on the Upper Nile; became Bishop of West Buganda)
28 November 19651976: Asanasio Maraka (previously archdeacon)
11 January 1976aft. 8 March 2000: Geresom Ilukor (diocese split immediately before; consecrated 11 January 1976, by Janani Luwum, Archbishop of Uganda, Rwanda, Burundi and Boga-Zaire, at Namirembe Cathedral)
bef. 2005bef. 2009: Bernard Obaikol
6 September 200912 July 2018: George Erwau
2018–2019: Nicodemus Okille, "caretaker bishop" (retired Bishop of Bukedi)
June 2019present: Kosea Odongo

Diocese of Busoga
Erected from the Diocese of Namirembe in 1972, the mother church is Christ Cathedral, Bugembe (in Jinja District).

Bishops of Busoga
1972–1998 (ret.): Cyprian Bamwoze
2002?January 2016 (ret.): Michael Kyomya
20 January 2016present: Paul Naimanhye

Diocese of Bukedi
Founded from Mbale diocese, 1972; the cathedral is St Peter's Cathedral, Tororo.

Bishops of Bukedi
19721984: Yona Okoth (became Archbishop of Uganda and Bishop of Kampala)
?–1983: Lucas Gonahasa, assistant bishop (became Assistant Bishop of Kampala)
1984November 2012: Nicodemus Okille
10 February 2013present: Sam Egesa

Diocese of North Mbale
Split from the Diocese of Mbale during 1992. The See is at St Matthew's Cathedral, Buhugu in Sironko District.

Bishops of North Mbale
9 August 19921997: Peter Mudonyi
23 March 1997August 2003 (res.): Nathan Muwombi
10 December 200616 November 2014: Dan Gimadu
16 November 2014present: Samuel Gidudu

Diocese of Sebei
Erect from Mbale diocese, 1999. The See is at St Peter's Cathedral, Kokwomurya, Kapchorwa.

Bishops of Sebei
1999–2015 (ret.): Augustine Salimo
12 April 2015present: Paul Masaba

Diocese of Kumi
From the Diocese of Soroti in 2001. St Philip's Cathedral, Ngora.

Bishop of Kumi
20012019 (ret.): Edison Irigei
Charles Okunya was elected bishop 7 November 2019, but that election was overturned by the House of Bishops on 5 February 2020.
2019–present (Acting): Charles Odurkami, retired Bishop of Lango

Diocese of Central Busoga
Founded in 2016 from the Busoga diocese; All Saints' Pro-Cathedral, Iganga.

Bishops of Central Busoga
13 November 2016present: Patrick Wakula

Diocese of East Busoga
Proposed for split from Busoga.

See also
 Anglican dioceses of Ankole and Kigezi
 Anglican dioceses of Buganda
 Anglican dioceses of Northern Uganda
 Anglican dioceses of Rwenzori
 List of Roman Catholic dioceses in Uganda

References

Church of Uganda